Jeppu is a locality in Mangalore city, Karnataka, India. It is situated on the southern part of Mangalore. Jeppu is on the bank of Nethravathi River. The National Highway 17 (India) passes through this locality.

Jeppu means sleep in local Tulu language. Tulu is the main language, which is spoken and understood by everyone in this locality. Beary And Dakhini Urdu is Spoken By Muslims in Jeppu. Konkani is another language that is commonly used. Jeppu is predominantly a residential area. However, there are several educational institutions run by Christian missionaries.

Occupation 

Jeppu is a low lying locality and is on the bank of the river Netravathi, and thus naturally agriculture and fishing have become the predominant occupations. Rice is the major crop grown here. However, in recent past people have stopped agriculture and now  all the barren fields used by real estate can be seen. You can also find wood industries and tile factories in this locality.

Educational Institutions in Jeppu 
 1. St Joseph Seminary - Industrial Training Institute
 2. Roshni Nilaya - College of Social Work
 3. St. Gerosa High School
 4. Cascia High School
 5. St Rita's English Higher Primary School
 6. St Rita's Kannada Higher Primary school
 7. St John's Kannada Higher Primary School
 8. St Gerosa English Higher Primary School
 9. Btnms English school

Religious places 
 1. Mangaladevi Temple. This is the temple of Goddess whom the city is named after. The dasara and navaratri festival are celebrated in a grand way here with a must-see processions at night.
 2. Mahanavamikatte (Marnamikatte in Tulu): This is the place where the statue of goddess Mangaladevi is brought during Dasara festival
 3. St Rita Cascia Church
 4. St Joseph's Church
 5. Gerosa Church
 6. Muhyidheen Jumah Masjid

Other important places 
 Jeppu Market: Separate vegetable & fish market along with some general stores
 MphasiS:  IT services company
 Primary Health Care Centre run by the City Corporation
 Shantinagar Graveyard
 Mangalore Club
 Bharat Maidan
 Bhagini Samaj
 Annachi ground
 Father Muller's Hospital
 Mahakalipdapu
 Morgans Gate
 Marnamikatte
 Railway bridge across Nethravathi river.
 Gujjar Kere
 The Hindu Newspaper: Mangalore Office
 Kusuma Stores

Localities in Mangalore